David Edward Goldberg (born September 26, 1953) is an American computer scientist, civil engineer, and former professor.  Until 2010, he was a professor in  the department of Industrial and Enterprise Systems Engineering (IESE) at the University of Illinois at Urbana-Champaign and was noted for his work in the field of genetic algorithms. He was the director of the Illinois Genetic Algorithms Laboratory (IlliGAL) and the co-founder & chief scientist of Nextumi, which later changed its name to ShareThis.  He is the author of Genetic Algorithms in Search, Optimization and Machine Learning, one of the most cited books in computer science.

Early life and education 
David E. Goldberg received a PhD in civil engineering in 1983 from the University of Michigan. His advisors were E. Benjamin Wylie and John Henry Holland. His students including Kalyanmoy Deb, Jeff Horn, and Hillol Kargupta.

In 2003 David Goldberg was appointed as the first holder of Jerry S. Dobrovolny Professorship in Entrepreneurial Engineering at the University of Illinois at Urbana-Champaign.

Publications 
 1983. Computer-aided gas pipeline operation using genetic algorithms and rule learning, PhD thesis. University of Michigan. Ann Arbor, MI.
 1989. Genetic Algorithms in Search, Optimization and Machine Learning. Addison-Wesley.
 1991. Real-coded genetic algorithms, virtual alphabets, and blocking. Complex Systems 5, pp. 139–167.
 1995. Life Skills and Leadership for Engineers. McGraw Hill
 2002. The Design of Innovation: Lessons from and for Competent Genetic Algorithms. Kluwer Academic Publishers.
 2006. The Entrepreneurial Engineer. Wiley.
 2014. A Whole New Engineer, with Mark Somerville. ThreeJoy.

References

External links 
 Illinois Genetic Algorithms Laboratory
 Department of Industrial and Enterprise Systems Engineering
 Distributed Innovation and Scalable Collaboration in Uncertain Settings

1953 births
American computer scientists
20th-century American Jews
Living people
Theoretical computer scientists
University of Michigan College of Engineering alumni
21st-century American Jews